Skrapan (Swedish word for "The Scraper") may refer to:

Skatteskrapan ("The Tax Scraper") in Stockholm.
Skrapan ("The Scraper"), a building in Västerås.
Studentskrapan, a dwelling skyscraper that includes student apartments ("studentlägenheter"), located in Skövde.